Rhodeus sinensis is a subtropical freshwater fish belonging to the Acheilognathinae subfamily of the family Cyprinidae.  It originated in inland rivers in China, and has been introduced as an exotic species in Afghanistan. The fish reaches a length up to 5.2 cm (2.0 in), and is native to freshwater habitats with a pH of 6.8 to 7.8, a hardness of 20 DH, and a temperature of 10 to 25 °C (50 to 77 °F). When spawning, the females deposit their eggs inside bivalves, where they hatch and the young remain until they can swim.

References 

sinensis
Fish described in 1868
Taxa named by Albert Günther